The 1999 West Lancashire District Council election took place on 6 May 1999 to elect members of  West Lancashire District Council in Lancashire, England. One third of the council was up for election and the Labour Party stayed in overall control of the council.

After the election, the composition of the council was:

Election result

References

1999
1999 English local elections
1990s in Lancashire